Mairasi ( Faranyao and Kaniran) is a Papuan language of the Bomberai Peninsula of West Papua, Indonesia.

The Northeastern dialect may be a distinct language.

Distribution
Locations:

Kaimana Regency
Interior villages: Umbran, Jamna Fata, Matna, Tarwata, Sara, Kasira, Orai, Wangatnau, Faranyau, and Sarifan
Coastal villages: Sisir, Foroma Jaya, Warasi, Lobo, Lomira, Morona, Nanggwaromi, Omay (May may), and Warika
Teluk Wondama Regency
Naikere District villages: Sararti, Oya, Yabore, Wosimo, Undurara, and Inyora

Phonology

Pronouns
Mairasi possessor prefixes are:
{| 
!  !! sg !! pl
|-
! 1
| o- || ee-
|-
! 2
| ne- || e-
|-
! 3
| na- || ne-
|}

Morphology

Case markers
Noun phrase case markers in Mairasi:
instrumental suffix -t
locative postposition ar
allative postposition ev(i)

Some examples:

Possessors
Mairasi possessor prefixes:
{| 
!  !! sg !! pl
|-
! 1
| o- || ee-
|-
! 2
| ne- || e-
|-
! 3
| na- || ne-
|}

Examples of inalienable possessors:

Directionals
Mairasi has two directional suffixes, which are only used with movement verbs.
-aʔi ‘up, inland’
-ari ‘down, seaward’

Examples of directional suffixes in use:

Animacy
Animacy is marked by the adjective modifier n-, as exemplified by the contrast in the following two noun phrases.

Vowel changes can modify the number of animate nouns:

References

Languages of western New Guinea
Mairasi languages